Poldark is a British historical drama television series based on the novels of the same title by Winston Graham and starring Aidan Turner in the lead role. The book series is 12 novels long but the TV series only portrays the first seven. The series was written and adapted by Debbie Horsfield for the BBC, and directed by several directors throughout its run. Set between 1781 and 1801, the plot follows the title character on his return to Cornwall after the American War of Independence in 1783.

Throughout it’s run, the series received positive reviews for it’s script, representation of life in the late 18th century and the performance of Turner. The series first aired on BBC One in the United Kingdom on 8 March 2015 in eight episodes, and in seven episodes on PBS in the United States, which supported the production, on 21 June 2015 as part of its Masterpiece anthology. The first series was based on the first two Poldark novels by Graham. It is the second screen adaptation of Graham's novels, following a television series broadcast by BBC One between 1975 and 1977.

On 8 April 2015, the BBC announced that a second series had been commissioned which premiered on 4 September 2016, and contained content from the third and fourth Poldark novels. The BBC announced on 6 July 2016, before series two had begun, that a third series had been commissioned based on the fifth and half of the sixth novels. The fourth series began airing on 10 June 2018, based on the sixth (second half) and seventh novels. Filming for the fifth and final series started in September 2018 and it was broadcast in July 2019. The final series ends the story in the year 1801, that is nine years before the time-setting of the eighth novel The Stranger from the Sea. The storyline for the fifth series was meant to give insight into Ross's story between the seventh and eighth novel, The Angry Tide and The Stranger from the Sea.

Plot overview
In 1783 Captain Ross Vennor Poldark returns from the American War of Independence to his home of Nampara in Cornwall after three years in the army.  Upon his return home, he discovers his father Joshua has died, his estate is in ruins and in considerable debt, and his childhood sweetheart Elizabeth is engaged to his cousin Francis.

He meets a young woman called Demelza Carne at Truro market and hires her as a scullery maid but they fall in love and marry in 1787. 
Throughout the five series, the story continues to follow the lives of Ross and Demelza, Elizabeth and Francis and George Warleggan while they deal with their marriages, lost loves, death, the birth of their children and war.

Cast

Main
 Aidan Turner as Captain Ross Vennor Poldark 
 Eleanor Tomlinson as Demelza Poldark (née Carne)
 Ruby Bentall as Verity Blamey (née Poldark)
 Caroline Blakiston as Agatha Poldark (series 1–3, guest series 4)
 Phil Davis as Jud Paynter (series 1–2)
 Beatie Edney as Prudie Paynter
 Jack Farthing as George Warleggan
 Luke Norris as Dr Dwight Enys
 Heida Reed as Elizabeth Poldark (née Chynoweth, and later Warleggan) (series 1–4, guest series 5)
 Kyle Soller as Francis Poldark (series 1–2, guest series 4)
 Pip Torrens as Cary Warleggan
 Warren Clarke as Charles Poldark (series 1)
 Gabriella Wilde as Caroline Penvenen (series 2–5)
 John Nettles as Ray Penvenen (series 2–3)
 Christian Brassington as Reverend Osborne "Ossie" Whitworth (series 3–4)
 Ellise Chappell as Morwenna Carne (previously Whitworth, née Chynoweth) (series 3–5)
 Sean Gilder as Tholly Tregirls (series 3–4)
 Harry Richardson as Drake Carne (series 3–5)
 Josh Whitehouse as Lieutenant Hugh Armitage (series 3–4)
 Tom York as Sam Carne (series 3–5)
 Tim Dutton as Joseph Merceron (series 5)
 Kerri McLean as Catherine "Kitty" Despard (series 5)
 Vincent Regan as Colonel Edward "Ned" Despard (series 5)
 Peter Sullivan as Ralph Hanson (series 5)
 Tristan Sturrock as Captain Zacky Martin (recurring series 1–4, main series 5)

Recurring

 Robin Ellis as the Reverend Dr Halse (Ellis played Ross Poldark in the 1975 TV series)
 Richard Hope as Harris Pascoe
 Ed Browning as Paul Daniel
 John Hollingworth as Captain William Henshawe (series 1–3)
 Rory Wilton as Richard Tonkin (series 1–2)
 Richard Harrington as Captain Andrew Blamey (series 1–3)
 Gracee O'Brien as Jinny Carter (series 1–2)
 Emma Spurgin Hussey as Mrs Zacky Martin (series 1–2)
 Matthew Wilson as Mark Daniel (series 1–2)
 Sally Dexter as Mrs Chynoweth (series 1–2)
 Henry Garrett as Captain Malcolm McNeil (series 1–2)
 Mark Frost as Tom Carne (series 1–3)
 Crystal Leaity as Margaret Vosper (series 1–2)
 Patrick Ryecart as Sir Hugh Bodrugan (series 1–2)
 Michael Culkin as Horace Treneglos (series 1–2)
 Jason Thorpe as Mathew Sanson (series 1)
 Robert Daws as Dr Tom Choake (series 1-4)
 Alexander Arnold as Jim Carter (series 1)
 Sabrina Bartlett as Keren Daniel (née Smith) (series 1)
 Harriet Ballard as Ruth Treneglos (née Teague) (series 1)
 Mary Woodvine as Mrs Teague (series 1)
 Daniel Cook as John Treneglos (series 1)
 Jason Squibb as Reverend Odgers (series 1, 3, 4)
 Sebastian Armesto as Tankard (series 2)
 Hugh Skinner as Lord Unwin Trevaunance (series 2)
 Ross Green as Charlie Kempthorne (series 2)
 Amelia Clarkson as Rosina Carne (née Hoblyn) (series 2, 4, 5)
 John MacNeill as Jacka Hoblyn (series 2, 4, 5)
 Lewis Peek as Ted Carkeek (series 2)
 Rose Reynolds as Betty Carkeek (series 2)
 Alexander Morris as Captain James Blamey (series 2)
 Isabella Parriss as Esther Blamey (series 2)
 Turlough Convery as Tom Harry (series 2–4)
 Richard McCabe as Mr Trencrom (series 2–3)
 Harry Marcus as Geoffrey Charles Poldark (series 3)
 Louis Davison as Geoffrey Charles Poldark (series 4)
 John Hopkins as Sir Francis Basset (series 3–4)
 James Wilby as Lord Falmouth (series 3–4)
 Ciara Charteris as Emma Tregirls (series 3–4)
 Esme Coy as Rowella Solway (née Chynoweth) (series 3–4)
 Will Merrick as Arthur Solway (series 3–4)
 Edward Bennett as Prime Minister William Pitt (series 4)
 Jack Riddiford as Jago Martin (series 4)
 Robin McCallum as Justice Trehearne (series 4)
 Emily Patrick as Belinda (series 4)
 Mike Burnside as Nathaniel Pearce (series 4)
 Cornelius Booth as Sir Christopher Hawkins (series 4)
 Danny Kirrane as Harry Harry (series 4)
 Josh Taylor as Viscount Bollington (series 4)
 Sophie Simnett as Andromeda Page (series 4)
 Charlie Field as John Craven (series 4)
 Adrian Lukis as Sir John Mitford (series 4)
 Richard Durden as Dr Anselm (series 4)
 Max Bennett as Monk Adderley (series 4)
 Rebecca Front as Lady Whitworth (series 4, guest series 5)
 Freddie Wise as Geoffrey Charles Poldark (series 5)
 Lily Dodsworth-Evans as Cecily Hanson (series 5)
 Sofia Oxenham as Tess Tregidden (series 5)
 Anthony Calf as William Wickham (series 5)
 Woody Norman as Valentine Warleggan (series 5)
 Wensdae Gibbons as Clowance Poldark (series 5)
 Oscar Novak as Jeremy Poldark (series 5)
 Andrew Gower as James Hadfield (series 5)
 Eoin Lynch as John Macnamara (series 5)
 Peter Forbes as Thomas Erskine (series 5)
 Norman Bowman as James Bannantine (series 5)
 Simon Williams as Lord Justice Kenyon (series 5)
 Simon Thorp as Dr Penrose (series 5)
 Alexander Perkins as Stone (series 5)
 Sam Crane as Sir Spencer Percival (series 5)
 William Sebag-Montefiore as Foreman of the Jury (series 5)
 Richard Dixon as Lord Ellenborough (series 5)
 Dan O'Keefe as Coldbath Prison Guard (series 5)
 Don Gallagher as Vicar (series 5) 
 Zachary Fall as Laurent (series 5)
 Nico Rogner as General Jules Toussaint (series 5)

Episodes

Production
The series was one of the final commissions by former BBC One controller Danny Cohen. Filming began in Cornwall and Bristol in April 2014. The production company is Mammoth Screen. Independent Television (ITV) bought the production company and worked on the second series. The production base for each series was The Bottle Yard Studios in Bristol, England, where purpose-built sets for Poldark's home 'Nampara' and The Red Lion pub have been located since series 1. For series 4, 18 sets were built across 3 studios at The Bottle Yard Studios, including five composite houses (Poldark in Cornwall and London, the Warleggans in Cornwall and London and the Whitworth Vicarage) and a period-correct scale replica of the House of Commons. Production offices, construction, prop workshops and extensive costume department were also based at the Studios.

Filming locations include the north Cornwall coast at St Agnes Head, which represents the 'Nampara Valley', and the Botallack Mine near St Just in Penwith, which is featured as 'Wheal Leisure', the mine that Ross Poldark attempts to resurrect. The beach of Church Cove, Gunwalloe on the Lizard Peninsula was used as a location for a shipwreck scene. Town scenes were filmed at Corsham in Wiltshire. and in Frome, Somerset. The underground scenes were filmed at Poldark Mine in Cornwall. Some interior scenes were shot at Prior Park College in Bath, Somerset. Charlestown near St Austell stood in for the city of Truro. Other film locations include Porthgwarra on the St Aubyn Estates, Porthcothan beach near Newquay, Bodmin Moor, St Breward, the coast between Botallack and Levant, cliffs in the Padstow area, Porthcothan near Newquay, Holywell Bay, Porthcurno, Kynance Cove, Predannack Wollas on The Lizard and Park Head near Porthcothan, all in Cornwall. In Tetbury, Gloucestershire the house portrayed as Trenwith, is managed by the Historic Houses Association (HHA) and the house was used for other series including Wolf Hall, Lark Rise to Candleford, and Tess of the D'Urbervilles. Filming of Series 4 was reported in Wells, Somerset. Series 5, aired in 2019, added several new cast members. Screenwriter Debbie Horsfield wrote Series 5.

The theme music for the series was composed by Anne Dudley.

Broadcasts and reception

Broadcasts 
In the United States, the series began to be broadcast in June 2015 on PBS, shown as part of the series Masterpiece.
Poldark commenced screening on ABC TV in Australia on 12 April 2015, and in New Zealand on 22 April 2015 on Prime. The series has also been airing since 2015 on the UK-based Persian language satellite television network Manoto 1 which beams into different areas in Europe and the Middle East for Persian speakers. It was shown on SVT in Sweden, the first series in autumn 2015, and the second series in spring 2017. On YLE in Finland, the first and second series aired from October 2016 to February 2017. The series was shown on NRK in Norway, starting in September 2015. In early 2018 Poldark Series 1 was also broadcast on Dutch public television NPO KRO-NCRV. In the autumn and early summer of 2019, Series 2 aired on Saturday evenings.

Critical reception 

On Rotten Tomatoes, the first season holds an approval rating of 91% based on 23 reviews, with an average rating of 7/10. The site's critical consensus reads, "Like an epic romance novel come to life, Poldark offers a sumptuous visual feast, from gorgeous scenery to a charming, handsome lead." On Metacritic, season one has a weighted average score of 72 out of 100, based on reviews from 14 critics, indicating "generally favorable reviews".

Reviewing season 1, Mike Hale of The New York Times called the series "Sweeping, stirring, rousing...good stuff" and his colleague Sarah Seltzer also wrote: "the series delivers immediately on the panoramic scenery and romance that this genre demands: plunging cliffs, green fields, galloping horses and burning glances aplenty".
Brian Lowry of Variety wrote: "Turner brings the necessary swoon-worthy qualities to the emotionally wounded lead...but the cast is uniformly good." Lowry also praised the "gorgeous photography" and the "haunting, wonderfully romantic score." Keith Uhlich of The Hollywood Reporter made positive comparisons to the kind of romance novels sold in airports and said "This is trash done ecstatically well."

On Rotten Tomatoes, seasons 3, and 5 hold respective ratings of 100%, and 86%, with season five's consensus reading: "Poldarks final season gives fans exactly what they want: emotionally involving period drama fueled by exceptional chemistry with just the right amount of ridiculousness."
Reviewing season 5, Emine Saner of The Guardian called it "gloriously entertaining" and although she was critical of the series for "its jumpy approach to time and ludicrous storylines" and called it an "unwieldy anachronistic beast of a story", she praised the performances of Turner and Tomlinson and the resonance they gave to the story. Therefore, Emnie called it "the perfect farewell."

Rosamund Barteau, Winston Graham's daughter, said that in relating to the show,  "[O]ur father would have been very, very pleased. He really loved the Poldark novels and even though he wrote all his life he was particularly attached to Poldark....I think what the BBC has done is amazing. The new adaptation is beautiful and very true to my father's words. Debbie Horsfield has done an excellent job, so I am absolutely happy with the treatment they've given it."

References

External links

 
 Poldark at PBS
 
 

BBC television dramas
2015 British television series debuts
2019 British television series endings
2010s British drama television series
BBC high definition shows
Television series set in the 18th century
Television shows based on British novels
Television shows set in Cornwall
Television series by ITV Studios
Television series by Mammoth Screen
English-language television shows